Karl Fedorovich Kessler (19 November 1815 – 3 March 1881) was a Baltic German zoologist who worked as a professor of biology at Saint Petersburg Imperial University. Among his contributions was the idea that evolution at an infraspecific level involved mutual aid and that Charles Darwin had placed too much emphasis on competition which he accepted as occurring at the interspecies level.

Life and work 
Kessler was born in Damrau, Konigsberg where his father was a royal forester (oberforestmeister). His father moved to Novgorod Governorate where Kessler grew up. He attended the zoology lectures of Stepan Kutorga. After graduation he worked as a school mathematics teacher. In 1837, Kessler and his botanist friend from student days,  went on an expedition to Finland. In 1840 he defended a master's dissertation on the legs of birds in relation to systematics. In 1842, his doctoral dissertation was on the skeleton of woodpeckers in relation to their classification. He then obtained a zoology chair at the University of Kyiv, a position vacated by Alexander von Middendorff who went to Siberia on an expedition. Kessler collected and examined numerous taxa across the region. He conducted most of his studies of birds in Ukrainian regions of the Russian Empire: Kiev Governorate, Volyn Governorate, Kherson Governorate, Poltava Governorate and Bessarabia. He also studied the fish of the Dniester, Dnieper, and Southern Bug rivers, and on the Ukrainian coast of the Black Sea. Based on the fish fauna, he hypothesized that several of the lakes in the region were earlier connected. He suggested that the Black and Caspian Seas had separated early and that the  Black Sea and the Mediterranean had been connected by streams. Thus he was among the early zoogeographers. In 1862, he replaced Stepan Kutorga at Saint Petersburg Imperial University. Here he established a zoology department. The anarchist Peter Kropotkin later developed this theory in his book Mutual Aid: A Factor of Evolution.

Eponymy
Numerous species have been named after Kessler including Kessler's gudgeon (Romanogobio kesslerii), Ponticola kessleri, Barbus kessleri,  and Turdus kessleri are named after him.

See also
:Category:Taxa named by Karl Kessler
Antoine Laurent Apollinaire Fée
Jean-Charles Houzeau
Alphonse Toussenel

References

External link
 Руководство для определения птиц, которые водятся или встречаются в Европейской России (1847)

1815 births
1881 deaths
19th-century zoologists from the Russian Empire
Corresponding members of the Saint Petersburg Academy of Sciences
Biologists from the Russian Empire
Evolutionary biologists
People from the Russian Empire of German descent
Rectors of Saint Petersburg State University
Ukrainian ichthyologists
Ukrainian ornithologists
Ukrainian zoologists
Privy Councillor (Russian Empire)